Teams in the National Football League (NFL) retire jersey numbers of players who either are considered by the team to have made significant contributions to that team's success, or who have experienced untimely deaths during their playing career. As with other leagues, once a team retires a player's jersey number, it never issues the number to any other player, unless the player or team explicitly allows it.

History
Since NFL teams began retiring numbers, 156 players have had their jersey number retired. The Chicago Bears and the New York Giants have the most retired numbers of the teams with 14 each. Only one player, Reggie White, has had his number retired by two teams, although Peyton Manning received an acknowledgment when the Denver Broncos re-retired the number 18, which is officially retired under the name of Frank Tripucka (who granted Manning a special exception to wear the number). Three teams –the Las Vegas Raiders, the Atlanta Falcons, and the Dallas Cowboys– traditionally do not retire jersey numbers. Also without a retired jersey number are the Baltimore Ravens and the Houston Texans, though they are less than 30 years old. The Texans, who are the newest member of the league, did not make its first playoff appearance until 2011, and have not yet built up a history long enough to warrant retiring a number.

The Buffalo Bills under Ralph Wilson also did not, with the exception of Jim Kelly, officially retire jersey numbers; this policy was reversed under Wilson's successor Terry Pegula.

Unlike Major League Baseball (which retired Jackie Robinson's number 42), the National Hockey League (which retired Wayne Gretzky's 99), and the National Basketball Association (which retired Bill Russell's 6), the NFL has never retired a jersey number league-wide in honor of anyone. Numbers 0 and 00 are no longer allowed, but were not retired in honor of any particular player; rather, the NFL's positional numbering system, imposed in 1973, simply does not allocate a position for players wearing those numbers (the NFL allowed those numbers in the past; Johnny Olszewski, Obert Logan, Jim Otto, and Ken Burrough all wore 0 or 00). The numbers can be, and rarely are, used in the preseason when no other numbers for a player's position are available.

Retired numbers

Key:

*- Player listed as honorable mention and was allowed to wear number after original retirement

See also
List of Green Bay Packers retired numbers
Los Angeles Chargers retired numbers
List of San Francisco 49ers retired numbers
List of NCAA football retired numbers

References

Retired numbers
Ret
 
Lists of retired numbers